Eparchy of Žiča is one of the eparchies of the Serbian Orthodox Church in the Republic of Serbia. It is seated in Kraljevo, in the Monastery of Žiča. Since 2014, diocesan bishop is Justin Stefanović.

History

The Eparchy of Žiča is named after the Monastery of Žiča that was built around 1208 by Grand Prince Stefan Nemanjić of Serbia, who brought in Greek builders to construct the monastery. In 1219, first Serbian Archbishop Saint Sava chose Žiča to be the Serbian Archiepiscopal seat (Archbishopric of Žiča). Since then, Archdiocese of Žiča was the central eparchy of Serbian Orthodox Church and the cathedral church of Žiča was serving for coronations of Serbian kings of the Nemanjić dynasty.

The seat of the Serbian Church was moved in 1253 to the Monastery of Peć. The collection of church law known as "Nomocanon of Saint Sava" was copied at the Monastery of Žiča and was for several centuries influential in southeastern Europe and Russia. In the middle of the 15th century, a return of the archiepiscopal seat to Žiča was contemplated due to the Turkish invasion, but the move was not made. In the 16th century, after the Serbian Patriarchate of Peć was renewed, several Metropolitans of Žiča were appointed.

By the beginning of 18th century the territory of this eparchy was incorporated into the Eparchy of Užice and Valjevo. In 1766, Serbian Patriarchate of Peć was abolished, and all of its eparchies that were under Ottoman rule fell under jurisdiction of the Ecumenical Patriarchate of Constantinople. In 1831, autonomous Metropolitanate of Belgrade was recreated, with Eparchy of Užice as one of its dioceses. In 1884, the name of that eparchy was officially changed to "Eparchy of Žiča".

Church-buildings

Bishops, since 1831 
 Nikifor Maksimović, 1831–1853
 Joanikije Nešković, 1854–1873
 Vikentije Krasojević, 1873–1882
 Kornilije Stanković, 1883–1885
 Nikanor Ružičić, 1886–1889
 Sava Barać, 1889–1913
 Nikolaj Velimirović, 1919–1920
 Jefrem Bojović, 1920–1933
 Nikolaj Velimirović, 1936–1956, absent since 1941
 Vikentije Prodanov, administration 1941–1947
 Valerijan Stefanović, administration 1947–1949
 Josif Cvijović, administration
 German Đorić, 1956–1958
 Vasilije Kostić, 1961–1978
 Stefan Boca, 1978–2003
 Hrizostom Stolić, 2003–2012
 Jovan Mladenović, administration 2012–2014
 Justin Stefanović, 2014–present

References

Bibliography
 
 
 
 
 

Serbian Orthodox Church in Serbia
Religious sees of the Serbian Orthodox Church
History of the Serbian Orthodox Church
1208 establishments in Europe
Religious organizations established in the 1200s
Dioceses established in the 13th century
Saint Sava